Edison Joseph (born November 27, 1989) is an Iranian professional football player of Nigerian origin, who plays as a striker and last played for Southern Samity in the I-League 2nd Division.

History
Joseph was born in the port city of Lagos, Nigeria.

In 2009, he played for Shaanxi Neo-China Chanba F.C. in the Chinese Super League.

References

Expatriate footballers in Iran
Nigerian footballers
Nigerian people of Iranian descent
Living people
1986 births
Chinese Super League players
Beijing Renhe F.C. players
Expatriate footballers in China
Expatriate footballers in India
Nigerian expatriates in China
Association football forwards
Iranian expatriate sportspeople in India
Sportspeople of Iranian descent